Carlo Cicala or Carlo Cicada was a Roman Catholic prelate who served as Bishop of Albenga (1554–1572).).

Biography
On 30 March 1554, Carlo Cicala was appointed during the papacy of Pope Julius III as Bishop of Albenga. He served as Bishop of Albenga until his resignation in 1572.

Episcopal succession
While bishop, he was the principal co-consecrator of: 
Benedetto Lomellini, Bishop of Ventimiglia (1565);
Filippo Spinola, Bishop of Bisignano (1566); and 
Luca Fieschi, Bishop of Andria (1566).

References

External links and additional sources
 (for Chronology of Bishops) 
 (for Chronology of Bishops) 

16th-century Italian Roman Catholic bishops
Bishops appointed by Pope Julius III